A Film with No Name is a 1988 Yugoslav drama film directed by Srđan Karanović.
It won Golden Tulip Award at the International Istanbul Film Festival in 1989.

References

External links 

1988 drama films
1988 films
Yugoslav drama films
Serbian drama films
Films set in Yugoslavia
Films set in Serbia
Films set in Kosovo
Films shot in Serbia